Hanson Edward Ely (November 23, 1867 – April 28, 1958) was a United States Army officer in the late 19th and early 20th centuries. He served in several conflicts, including the Spanish–American War and World War I, and he received the Army Distinguished Service Medal and numerous other awards for his role in them.

Military career
Ely was born in Independence, Iowa, on November 23, 1867. He graduated from the United States Military Academy in 1891. His fellow classmates included Andrew Hero Jr., James Francis McIndoe, John W. Heavey, John Jewsbury Bradley and Edwin B. Winans, all future general officers. He was commissioned into the 22nd Infantry Regiment.

After serving in Montana, North Dakota, and Nebraska, Ely became a Professor of Military Science and Tactics at the University of Iowa, serving in this position from 1897 to 1898. During the Spanish–American War, Ely reported to his regiment at Camp Wikoff and then served in the Philippines from 1899 to 1901. In addition to commanding General Frederick Funston's mounted scouts, Ely served as a regimental and district adjutant in Luzon. He received his first Silver Star due to his efforts in the Philippines.

Ely graduated from the Infantry and Cavalry School in July 1905 and the Staff College in July 1906. He attended the German Army Maneuvers in 1906, and he again served in the Philippines from 1907 to 1912. Ely twice commanded Company K of the 26th Infantry.

Ely served with Funston on the United States occupation of Veracruz in 1914. He graduated from a course at the United States Army War College in May 1916.

From July 20 to August 24, 1917 Ely served as the Provost-marshal of the American Expeditionary Forces (AEF) of World War I. He commanded the 28th Infantry Regiment until his promotion to the rank of brigadier general in 1918, when he assumed command of the 3rd Brigade. On October 1, 1918, he was promoted to major general, even though his permanent rank was only lieutenant colonel. Starting on November 18, 1918, a week after the Armistice with Germany, Ely assumed command of the 2nd Division and then the 5th Division shortly afterwards. For his actions in the war, he received another Silver Star as well as the Distinguished Service Cross and the Army Distinguished Service Medal. He also received the Legion of Honour and five Croix de Guerres from the French.

After returning to the U.S., Ely reverted to his permanent rank of lieutenant colonel on July 19, 1919. He was promoted to colonel on February 16, 1920 and graduated from a second course at the Army War College in July 1920. Promoted to brigadier general, Ely commanded the 3rd Brigade again from September 1920 to March 1921. He then served as the Commandant of the United States Army Command and General Staff College from August 1921 to 1923. After his permanent promotion to major general in 1923, Ely became the commandant of the Army War College, a position he served in until 1927. His last assignment was at Second Corps Area on Governors Island in New York.  In 1925, he published a report that was highly critical of black soldiers in World War I and recommended the army continue to keep them in segregated units.

Ely retired on November 10, 1931, after reaching the mandatory retirement age of 64. He died on April 28, 1958, in Atlantic Beach, Florida. Ely is buried in Arlington National Cemetery.

References

Bibliography

External links

|-

|-

1867 births
1958 deaths
People from Independence, Iowa
United States Military Academy alumni
Military personnel from Iowa
United States Army Infantry Branch personnel
University of Iowa faculty
American military personnel of the Spanish–American War
Recipients of the Silver Star
United States Army Command and General Staff College alumni
United States Army War College alumni
United States Army generals of World War I
Recipients of the Distinguished Service Cross (United States)
Recipients of the Distinguished Service Medal (US Army)
Officiers of the Légion d'honneur
Recipients of the Croix de Guerre 1914–1918 (France)
United States Army generals
Commandants of the United States Army Command and General Staff College
Burials at Arlington National Cemetery